Morehead Patterson (October 9, 1897 – August 5, 1962) was an American businessman, a diplomat, an inventor, and president, CEO and chairman of American Machine and Foundry, the company founded by his father Rufus Patterson.

Patterson led expansion of AMF from $5 million a year company to $500 million a year conglomerate.
Patterson was also chairman of the Brookings Institution (elected 1959).
Patterson was born in Durham, North Carolina in 1897 and attended Yale University, Oxford University and Harvard University, earning a law degree from Harvard University in 1924.

References 

1897 births
1962 deaths
American chief executives
Businesspeople from Durham, North Carolina
Harvard Law School alumni
Yale University alumni
20th-century American inventors
20th-century American businesspeople